Shaun C. Nua (born May 22, 1981) is a former American football defensive end and current football coach. He played college football at Brigham Young University and was drafted by the Pittsburgh Steelers in the seventh round of the 2005 NFL Draft. Nua is currently the defensive line coach for the USC Trojans football team.

Early years
Nua was born in Pago Pago, the capital city of American Samoa – an unincorporated territory of the United States located in the South Pacific Ocean. He was the second oldest of six children born to Sao and Usu Nua, a farmer and nurse, respectively.

Nua attended Tafuna High School in Tafuna, American Samoa. As a senior, he earned All-League honors as a defensive end, however he suffered a torn ACL.  Nua moved to the Hawaiian island of Oahu to live with an aunt for six months while recovering from his knee injury.  From there, he moved to Phoenix, Arizona to live with his sister, who was an undergraduate student at Arizona State University.

College career
Nua first attended Eastern Arizona College, a junior college in Graham County, Arizona. Eastern Arizona assistant football coach and BYU alum (and current BYU head football coach) Kalani Sitake was instrumental in steering Nua towards a Division 1 scholarship at BYU.

Nua redshirted in 2003 before returning in the 2004 season and earning second-team All-Mountain West Conference honors as a senior. He ultimately appeared in 22 games, posting 54 tackles (30 solo, 24 assist) and 10 sacks in his career at BYU. Nua graduated from BYU in 2005 with a bachelor’s degree in youth and family recreation, and later earned his master’s degree from BYU in recreation management in 2013.

Pro career
Nua was selected by the Pittsburgh Steelers in the seventh round of the 2005 NFL Draft. He would spend the next three seasons on the Steelers offseason roster and practice squad, earning a Super Bowl ring with the Steelers championship in 2006.  In 2008, Nua was signed to a future/reserve contract with the Buffalo Bills, however he was released before the season.

Coaching career
Following his stint in the NFL, Nua returned to his alma mater as a defensive graduate assistant on the staff of BYU head coach Bronco Mendenhall from 2009-2011.  Nua helped the Cougars achieve the nation's 24th-best total defense in 2010 and the 13th-ranked defense in 2011. BYU won its bowl games both years while finishing the 2011 season ranked No. 25 in the final USA Today Coaches Poll with a 10-3 record.

On January 26, 2012 Nua joined the coaching staff of Ken Niumatalolo at Navy as defensive line coach.

On January 7, 2018 Nua joined the coaching staff of Herm Edwards at Arizona State as defensive line coach.

On January 17, 2019, Nua joined the coaching staff of Jim Harbaugh at Michigan as defensive line coach.  Nua signed a two-year employment agreement that pays him an annual salary of $400,000.

Personal
Nua and his wife Hilary have three children: Losi, Kelina, and Malia.

Nua is cousin to BYU Softball All-American and Hall of Famer Ianeta Le'i, and BYU Volleyball All-American and National Team member Futi Tavana.

References

External links
 

1981 births
Living people
American football defensive ends
American football defensive tackles
Arizona State Sun Devils football coaches
Buffalo Bills players
BYU Cougars football players
BYU Cougars football coaches
Eastern Arizona Gila Monsters football players
Michigan Wolverines football coaches
Navy Midshipmen football coaches
Pittsburgh Steelers players
USC Trojans football coaches
People from Pago Pago
Players of American football from American Samoa
American sportspeople of Samoan descent